Åkerströms blandning (English: Åkerström's mix) is the last studio album by Swedish folk singer-songwriter and guitar player Fred Åkerström.

Track listing
 "Artisten"
 "En liten konstnär"
 "Kajsas udde"
 "När du går"
 "Möte med musik"
 "Far har fortalt"
 "Liten gosse"
 "Fragancia"
 "Visa till Katarina"
 "Margareta"
 "Sann berättelse ur livet"
 "Vän av ordning"
 "Ett liv efter detta"

External links
 Lyrics

1982 albums
Fred Åkerström albums
Swedish-language albums